Terry Allan Stieve (born March 10, 1954 in Baraboo, Wisconsin) is a retired American football offensive lineman.

Stieve was drafted out of the University of Wisconsin–Madison in the 1976 NFL Draft by the New Orleans Saints.  He also played for the St. Louis Cardinals.

Stieve started 98 games as an offensive guard, two years with the New Orleans Saints coached by Hank Stram and seven years with the St. Louis Cardinals. Stieve missed the entire 1980 season due to knee injury.

1954 births
Living people
American football offensive guards
Wisconsin Badgers football players
New Orleans Saints players
St. Louis Cardinals (football) players
People from Baraboo, Wisconsin
Players of American football from Wisconsin
Ed Block Courage Award recipients